Karthon the Quester is a fictional character appearing in American comic books published by Marvel Comics.

Publication history
Karthon first appeared in Sub-Mariner #9 (January 1969), and was created by Roy Thomas and Marie Severin.

The character subsequently appears in Sub-Mariner #12-13 (April-May 1969), #32 (December 1970), and #36 (April, 1976).

Fictional character biography
Karthon is a member of the scaly-skinned subspecies of Homo mermanus called Lemurians.  He served Naga as the foremost of his "Questers", searching on behalf of the undersea kingdom of Lemuria to retrieve the legendary Serpent Crown, which had been lost beneath the sea by Paul Destine.  Namor found the Crown at the same time as Karthon. The two fought over the Serpent Crown.  Karthon told Namor that the Crown would allow the Lemurians to conquer the world, but Namor revealed to Karthon that the Crown was actually a vessel empowered by the demonic Elder God Set. As the two fought, Captain Barracuda and his crew inadvertently captured them in an electrified net.  Namor broke free and fought Barracuda's forces, while Karthon took the Serpent Crown and fled back towards Lemuria.

Namor managed to catch up with Karthon and the two continued to fight over it until Karthon subdued Namor and subverted his will.  The two traveled to Lemuria, where Karthon returned the Serpent Crown to Naga. Naga ordered Namor's death, and when Karthon refused to murder him, Naga struck Karthon down using the Serpent Crown and sent the other Questers to attack Namor. Namor collapsed the royal chamber over Naga's throne. Karthon tried to hold back the vengeful Namor, who tossed both Karthon and the other Questers aside. Karthon asked Naga to stay his hand against Namor, and Naga instead obliterated the other Questers. The despondent Karthon asked Naga to destroy him as well, but Naga wished to keep Karthon as his enforcer. When Naga caused the death of Karthon's sister Llyna, Karthon became enraged by this final betrayal and slew Naga from behind with his sword. Karthon nearly fell to the evil call of the Serpent Crown, but Namor placed the Crown on Naga's corpse, which was then pulled into a great fissure which opened in the ocean floor.

The Lemurians proclaimed Karthon their new king, and he accepted, vowing to end Lemuria's history of despotic rulers. Karthon's rule is wise and just, and the Lemurians became allies of the Atlanteans.

Llyra, the High Priestess of Set, managed to subdue Karthon and usurp the leadership of Lemuria for herself.  When Namor tried to recruit Karthon and his nation as allies of Atlantis, he found Llyra ruling the city. Namor defeated Llyra and returned Karthon to the throne.

Karthon attended the wedding of Namor and Dorma, and assisted Namor and the Atlanteans against Attuma's attacking forces.

References

External links

Marvel Comics Atlanteans (Homo mermanus)